Aila is a female given name found in several different languages, pronounced as "ay-luh" or "eye-luh" depending on origin. It is the Finnish equivalent of Helga or Olga, meaning "bringer of light". In Scottish Gaelic, it means "from the strong place". It is also a variant spelling of the Turkish name Ayla (meaning "halo") and the Hebrew name Eilah (meaning "oak tree"). In Arabic and in Urdu, Aila means noble.

Notable people called Aila
Aila Flöjt, Finnish ski-orienteer
Aila Keto (born 1943), Australian conservationist of Finnish origin
Aila Meriluoto (born 1924), Finnish writer
Aila Paloniemi (born 1956), Finnish politician
Aila Winkler (born 1969), Croatian-American tennis player

See also
Eddie Aila, Papua New Guinean rugby football player
Pururavas Aila, the first king of the Aila dynasty or the Somavamsha

Feminine given names
Hebrew feminine given names
Scottish given names
Finnish feminine given names